The Vtáčnik Mountains are a mountain range in central Slovakia, which forms part of the Slovak Central Mountains (Slovenské stredohorie) within the Inner Western Carpathians.

It is bordered in the west, north and northeast by the upper Nitra basin, Strážov Mountains and Žiar, in the east by the Kremnica Mountains and Žiar basin, and in the south by Tribeč and the Štiavnica Mountains.

It is divided further into these geomorphological units:
 Vysoký Vtáčnik ("High Vtáčnik")
 Nízky Vtáčnik ("Low Vtáčnik")
 Župkovská brázda ("Župkov Furrow")
 Raj ("Paradise Mountains")

The four highest mountains are: Vtáčnik (1,346 m), Biela skala (1,136 m), Buchlov (1,040 m), and Žiar (845 m).

Some of the towns or villages around or in Vtáčnik include: Prievidza, Nováky, Handlová, Prochot, Lehota pod Vtáčnikom, and Veľké Pole.

External links
 

Mountain ranges of Slovakia
Mountain ranges of the Western Carpathians